Megamart was an Australian chain of stores owned by Coles Myer that sold electrical and furniture items. It was a sub-store of department store chain Myer, so it was also known as Megamart Your Mega Electrical & Furniture Store by Myer. Some Megamarts were bigger than smaller Myer stores.

According to Business reporter Stephen McMahon, the reason Megamart closed was that "Its small footprint meant it struggled to compete with rivals such as Harvey Norman and Dick Smith - while cannibalising Myer's own sales."

History
 1998: Coles Myer open the first Megamart store in Coorparoo, Queensland.
 2001: Coles Myer announces plans to expand the Megamart chain of furniture and electrical stores.
 2005: Coles Myer announces plans to "divest" Megamart due to poor performance. All stores stopped trading on 13 November. Out of the nine stores, six were bought out by Harvey Norman while the remaining three were bought by Clive Peeters (which was soon purchased by Harvey Norman itself).

See also
 Harvey Norman
 Mitre 10 Mega
 Big W
 My Pet Warehouse

References

Defunct retail companies of Australia